St. John Parish is a Roman Catholic church in Darien, Connecticut. It is part of the  Diocese of Bridgeport.

History 
This classic, turn-of-the-century church dates from shortly after the founding of the parish in 1895. New York City Opera tenor Frank Porretta served as the church's music director for more than 40 years.

In 2007, the Reverend Michael Jude Fay, who had been associated with the church, was convicted of stealing $1.3 million and later died while in prison. The online (New York Times at NBC) article by N. R. Kleinfield, which mentioned him, and another corrupt priest, in the context of talking about yet another Diocese of Bridgeport priest who had been prosecuted for methamphetamine dealing, did not explicitly say what position he had held there when he committed the crime or whether he had been pastor.

References

External links 
 St. John - website
 Diocese of Bridgeport

Roman Catholic churches in Connecticut
Churches in Fairfield County, Connecticut
Religious organizations established in 1895
Buildings and structures in Darien, Connecticut
Roman Catholic Diocese of Bridgeport
1895 establishments in Connecticut